{{Infobox rail line
|name =Donon Light Railway 
|logo = 
|logo_width =325
|logo_alt =
|image =Waldbahn-Station jenseits des Donon.jpg
|image_width =325
|caption =Forest railway in the Donon mountains
|linelength = • Schirmeck–Herkules: • Herkules–Colas: • Herkules–Moussey: 
|gauge = 
|minradius = 
|speed = 
|coordinates=
|map = Approximate route of the light railway on a modern map

Height profile of the Donon Light Railway: Schirmeck–Colas and Herkules–Moussey
{{BS-map|inline=1|map=

{{BS3||exBHF|||Herkules||}}

|}
}}
}}
It ran from Schirmeck in the Alsatian-speaking Alsace to Allarmont, Colas'' and Moussey in the French-speaking Vosges.

History 
The Donon Light Railway was built by the Germans as a forest railway at a time when Alsace belonged to the German Reich according to the Treaty of Frankfurt (1871). It was officially intended for logging, but had also a military and strategic significance from the very beginning, as it could quickly be used as a military railway in case the French wanted to recapture the area.

In 1886 forester Bierau, a forestry engineer stationed in Rothau, laid a network of forest railways in the state forests. Unloaded wagons were pulled up into the forest by horses, and after being loaded they rolled downhill by gravity. In 1892 an unusually violent storm devastated the forests of the Vosges, and hundreds of thousands of cubic metres of timber had to be transported to the sawmills. To minimise the transportation effort and cost, the German forestry administration procured two 50 hp  Krauss locomotives, at the suggestion of Bierau.

Track construction 
It was lengthened after the storm of 1892. The unusual track gauge of 700 mm was chosen, among other things, so that the French could not use the tracks with their Decauville and Péchot-Bourdon locomotives, which had a gauge of 600 mm, in the event of a military attack.

Instead of the rail frames of the Decauville Railways, which were common in France, Bierau used a system of tie rods developed by him. These were beneficial especially in curves and on steep gradients, as the track gauge could be adjusted slightly wider than on the straight sections of the line. He used a system without sleepers, where the rails were laid directly on the forest floor and only connected by strong tie rods. So-called angle brackets were used, which pressed themselves into the ground or had to be buried in it. The rails were as long as possible in straight sections to minimise the number of rail joints, but in curves shorter rails were preferred.

Route 
The  gauge track ran from Schirmeck to Herkules. There, a branch line ran to Moussey.

Locomotives 
In addition to the two Krauss locomotives, eight identical O&K steam locomotives (O&K works numbers 8244-8247 and 8291-8294) were used on the Donon Light Railway and Abreschviller Forest Railway.

Military use and decommissioning 
During World War I, the Dordon Light Railway was used for military purposes, as the front line ran through this mountainous area as predicted. After 1919 the railway was closed down and the tracks were dismantled. Forester Bierau, like many Alsatians born on the other side of the Rhine, had to leave Alsace.

References

External links 
 
 To commemorate the visit of railways built and operated by Kodeis B (commander of the railway troops) in the period from 28 May to 3 June 1918, Goswin von Haag, Captain & Commander of the Railway Troops

Narrow gauge railways in France
Railway lines opened in 1886
Railway lines closed in 1919
Railway lines in Grand Est